The 1979 Iowa Hawkeyes football team represented the University of Iowa in the 1979 Big Ten Conference football season. It was the first season for new head coach Hayden Fry, who arrived in Iowa City after spending the previous six years at North Texas State.

Schedule

Roster

Game summaries

Indiana

Sources: Box Score and Game Story
    
    
    
    
    
    
    
    
    

On October 22, 2016, former Indiana University coach and current ESPN College Football analyst Lee Corso described the game on College Gameday. He said at halftime he told the Hoosiers (who were losing the game 26-3) to not bother coming out for the 2nd half unless they were prepared to win the game. Indiana would then go on to win the game 30-26.

at Oklahoma

Source: Box Score and Game Story

Nebraska

Sources: Box Score and Game Story
    
    
    
    
    
    
    

For the second week in a row, the Hawkeyes faced a Big 8 opponent ranked in the top 10. Iowa led 21-14 at the end of the 3rd quarter, but Nebraska tied the game then recovered a fumble before kicking the winning field goal late.

Iowa State

Sources: Box Score and Game Story
    
    
    
    
    
    
    

This game marked Hayden Fry's first win as head coach of the Hawkeyes.

at Illinois

at Northwestern

Sources: Box Score and Game Story
    
    
    
    
    
    
    
    
    
    

Gordy Bohannan, a junior college transfer, made his first career start

Minnesota

Sources: Box Score and Game Story

at Wisconsin

Sources: Box Score and Game Story
    
    
    
    
    
    
    

Dennis Mosley broke Ed Podolak's single-season rushing record and caught a 75-yard touchdown pass in the win over the Badgers.

Purdue

at Ohio State

Michigan State

Sources: Box Score and Game Story

Awards and honors

Team players in the 1980 NFL Draft

References

Iowa
Iowa Hawkeyes football seasons
Iowa Hawkeyes football